Piddington is a hamlet in the parish of Piddington and Wheeler End in Buckinghamshire, England.  It is located on the main A40 between Stokenchurch and West Wycombe.

Piddington originally comprised a number of scattered farmsteads, a workhouse and manor house. Surviving buildings of which date to the 16th and 17th centuries. The Dashwood Arms pub was originally a coaching inn. At the turn of the century, a furniture factory was established and the hamlet grew under its influence. The factory is no more, but a small light industrial area now stands on its site.

There are no shops in Piddington - the nearest being in West Wycombe or Lane End. However, there is a village hall (which hosts many regular events including the annual Piddington Horticultural Society Show) and a playing field.

References

Hamlets in Buckinghamshire